Inga Falls is a rapid 40 km from Matadi in the Democratic Republic of the Congo where the Congo River drops 96 m (315 ft) over the course of 15 km (9 mi). The falls are part of a larger group of rapids in the lower Congo River. Livingstone Falls are located upstream closer to the Pool Malebo. These falls have formed in a sharp bend of Congo River where the width of river fluctuates from more than 4 km to only 260 m.

With a median discharge of 42,476 m³/s (1,500,000 ft³/s), the falls could be considered the largest in the world, but it is not widely considered to be a true waterfall. Its maximum recorded volume is 70,793 m³/s (2,500,000 ft³/s). Inga falls is also the site of two large hydroelectric dams, named Inga I and Inga II, as well as two projected dams, Inga III and the Grand Inga Dam, the latter of which would be the largest (by power production) in the world.

See also
List of waterfalls by flow rate

References

External links
 GENI Inga III page

Waterfalls of the Democratic Republic of the Congo